This is a list of people on postage stamps of Mexico, including the years in which they appeared on a stamp.

The list is complete through 2014.

0–9
10 Venado Pechera de Tigre, Mixtec princess (1982)

A
Mariano Abasolo, hero of Independence (1910)
Acamapichtli, Aztec ruler (1982)
Manuel Acuña, poet (2013)
Hermanas Águila, María Esperanza Águila (†1991) and María Paz Águila (†2004), singers (1995)
Enrique Aguilar González (1904–1957), educator (2004)
Cándido Aguilar Vargas, general (1997)
Gonzalo Aguirre Beltrán, anthropologist (2008)
Lauro Aguirre Espinosa (1882–1928), educator (1994)
Lucas Alamán, statesman and historian (1998)
Juan Aldama, hero of Independence (1910, 1975, 1986)
Miguel Alemán Valdés, president (1950, 2008)
David Alfaro Siqueiros, painter (1975, 1996)
Jorge Alessandri, president of Chile (1962)
Vito Alessio Robles, historian (1988)
Ignacio Allende, hero of Independence (1910, 1943, 1969, 1985, 1994, 2008)
Ignacio Altamirano, writer (1984, 1986, 1995)
Luis Álvarez Barret (1901–1971), educator (2000)
Joaquín Amaro Domínguez, general (1997)
Pedro María Anaya, president (1947, 1995)
Soledad Anaya Solórzano (1895–1978), educator (1998)
Felipe Ángeles, general (1997, 2014)
Fanny Anitúa, mezzo-soprano (1983)
Aristotle, Greek philosopher (1978)
Pedro Armendáriz, film star (1993)
Ponciano Arriaga, statesman (1956)
Carlos Arruza, matador (1996)
Dr. Atl, painter (1975) (painting Paricutín pictured 1971)
Mariano Azuela, novelist (1974)
José Azueta, naval lieutenant, hero (1964, 2014)

B
Johann Sebastian Bach, German composer (1985)
Lucas Balderas general (1947)
José María Barceló de Villagrán (1819–1872), surgeon (1996)
Luis Barragán, architect (interior staircase shown 2002)
Gabino Barreda, philosopher (1968, 1981)
Juan de la Barrera, cadet (1947)
Baudouin I, Belgian king (1965)
Gustavo Baz Prada, educator (1993)
Ludwig van Beethoven, German composer (1977) (handwritten score and signature pictured 1970)
Lola Beltrán, singer and actress (1995)
Jorge Mario Bergoglio, Argentine pope (2016)
Felipe Berriozábal, general (1995)
Rómulo Betancourt president of Venezuela (1965)
Andrés Eloy Blanco, poet (1997)
Adamo Boari, architect (2000)
Simón Bolívar, South American liberator (1980, 1983)
Juan Bosch, president of Dominican Republic (2009)
Gilberto Bosques, diplomat (2015)
Carlos Bracho (1899–1966), sculptor (1983)
Alberto Braniff, aviation pioneer (2010)
Nicolás Bravo, president (1986, 2010)
Luis Buñuel, filmmaker (2000)

C
Luis Cabrera Lobato, politician and writer (1910)
Plutarco Elías Calles, president (1995, 2000)
Cantinflas, film star (1993, 2011)
Enrique Carbajal "Sebastián", sculptor (sculpture shown" 1996)
Lázaro Cárdenas, president (1971, 1978, 1995)
Emilio Carranza, aviator (1929, 1947, 1978)
Jesús Carranza, general (1917)
Venustiano Carranza, president (1916, 1938, 1960, 1967, 1985, 1995, 1997, 2009, 2010, 2013)
Felipe Carrillo Puerto, governor (1974)
Julián Carrillo, composer (1975)
Juan Ignacio María de Castorena Ursúa y Goyeneche, bishop and founder of the first Mexican periodical (1944)
Pablo Casals, Spanish cellist (score of El pesebre shown 1976)
Estefanía Castañeda Núñez (1872–1937), educator (1994)
Alfonso Caso, archaeologist (1996)
Antonio Caso, philosopher (1983, 1988)
Isidro Castillo Pérez (1900–1988), educator (2006)
Guadalupe Ceniceros de Perez (1909–1968), educator (1999)
Miguel de Cervantes, Spanish author (1975, Don Quijote shown 2005)
Chabelo, television actor and host (2006)
Carlos Chávez, composer (1983, 1999)
Ignacio Chávez Sánchez, physician (1993, 1997)
Chespirito, television director, writer and actor (2006)
Francisco Javier Clavijero, priest and historian (1971, 1981)
Genaro Codina (1852–1901), composer (1946)
Rey Colimán (15th & 16th centuries), chief of the Colimas (1979)
Christopher Columbus, navigator (1992)
Jesús F. Contreras, sculptor (2016)
Copernicus, Polish astronomer (1973)
Dolores Correa Zapata, teacher, poet, feminist (2015)
Daniel Cosío Villegas, economist and historian (2001)
Cri-Cri (Francisco Gabilondo Soler), singer (1995)
Cuauhtémoc, Aztec ruler (1915, 1950, 1975, 1980, 1995)
Gonzalo Curiel, composer (1995)

D
Dante, Italian poet (1965)
Rubén Darío, Nicaraguan poet (1966)
Charles de Gaulle, French president (1964, 2014)
Mario de la Cueva, educator and jurist (2001)
Santos Degollado, general (1995)
Andrés Manuel del Río, scientist (1965)
Dolores del Río, film star (1993)
Demosthenes, Athenian orator (1974)
Francisco Díaz Covarrubias, geographer (1973)
Salvador Díaz Mirón, poet (1983)
Ponciano Díaz Salinas (1856–1899), bullfighter (1999)
Belisario Domínguez, martyr (1917, 1963)
Miguel Domínguez, statesman (2005)
Giovani dos Santos, football player (2010)
Alfredo Dugès, botanist (1975)
Albrecht Dürer, German painter (woodcut pictured 1971)

E
Thomas Alva Edison, US inventor (1981)
Eight Deer Tiger Claw, Mixtec warrior (1980)
Albert Einstein, Swiss physicist (1979, 2005)
Willem Einthoven, Dutch physiologist (1972)
Dieter Enkelin (1926-1995), entomologist (2011) 
Martín Enríquez de Almanza, viceroy (1946, 1956, 1979)
Luis Enrique Erro, astronomer (1973, 1986)
Mariano Escobedo, general (1997)
Juan Escutia, cadet (1947)
Fermín Espinosa "Armillita", bullfighter (1996, 2011))
Enrique Estrada, general (1946)
Genaro Estrada, diplomat and writer (1983)

F
Fabiola, Belgian queen (1965)
Felipe II, Spanish king (1979)
María Félix, movie star (1993)
José Joaquín Fernández de Lizardi, novelist (1972)
Joaquín Manuel Fernández de Santa Cruz, child subject of a painting by Nicolás Rodríguez Juárez (1996)
Alexander Fleming, British scientist (1981)
Ricardo Flores Magón, anarchist and labor organizer (2008)
Adela Formoso de Obregón Santacilia (1905–1981), educator and feminist (2001)
Pope Francis, Argentine pope (2016)
Sigmund Freud, Austrian psychiatrist (1997)

G
Francisco Gabilondo Soler, singer (1995, 2007)
Galileo, Italian astronomer (1971)
Rómulo Gallegos, Venezuelan novelist (1984)
Joaquín Gallo (1882–1965) astronomer (1973)
Joaquín Gamboa Pascoe, labor leader and politician (2016)
Manuel Gamio, anthropologist (1982)
Gandhi, leader of India's Independence movement (1969)
Pedro de Gante, missionary (1972)
Rodolfo Gaona, bullfighter (1996)
Alfonso García Robles, diplomat (1982)
Jesús García Corona, railroad engineer, hero (2007)
Federico García Lorca, Spanish poet (1998)
Francisco García Salinas, statesman (1946)
Francisco Garcia y Santos, Uruguayan postmaster general (1926)
Ángel María Garibay K., philologist (1982)
Gonzalo Garita y Frontera (1897–1921), engineer (2000)
Lorenzo Garza Arrambide, (1909–1978), bullfighter (1996)
Manuel Gea González (1892–1950), physician (1997)
Ernest Charles Gimpel, subject of a painting by Ángel Zárraga (1986)
Francisco Goitia, painter (1983)
Federico Gómez Santos pediatrician (1993)
Roberto Gómez Bolaños, television director, writer and actor (2006)
Valentín Gómez Farías, president (1956, 1975, 1981, 1983)
Manuel Gómez Morín, politician (1997)
María Luisa Gonzaga Foncerrada y Labarrieta, subject of a painting by José María Vázquez (1765–1826) (1996)
Epigmenio González, hero of Independence (1910)
Francisco González Bocanegra, poet (2004)
Guillermo González Camarena, inventor (1982)
Luz González Cosío de López, founder of the Mexican Red Cross (2010)
Roque González Garza, provisional president (2010)
Enrique González Martínez, poet (1972)
Jesús González Ortega, general and statesman (1946, 1981)
Celestino Gorostiza, playwright (2004)
João Goulart, Brazilian president (1962)
Juan de la Granja, introduced telegraph to Mexico (2000)
Andrés Guardado, football player (2010)
Juan Vicente de Güemes, 2nd Count of Revillagigedo, viceroy (1960)
Vicente Guerrero, hero of independence, president (1921, 1971, 1981, 1982, 1985, 2010)
Ángela Gurría, sculptor  (sculpture pictured 1976)
Eulalio Gutiérrez Ortiz, general and provisional president (2010, 2014)
Eulalia Guzmán, archeologist and teacher (2005)
León Guzmán, statesman (1956, 1975)
Martín Luis Guzmán, novelist (1985)
Rodolfo Guzmán Huerta, wrestler (2008)
Jorge Guzmán Rodríguez, wrestler (2008)

H
Guillermo Haro Barraza, astronomer (2013)
Andrés Henestrosa, writer (1996, 2006)
Francisco Hernández, naturalist (title page of book shown 1975)
Javier Hernández, football player (2014)
Juan E. Hernández y Dávalos, historian and collector of documents relating to Mexican Independence (1987)
Saturnino Herrán, painter (1987)
Alfonso L Herrera, biologist (1975, 2011)
Maclovio Herrera, general (1917)
Heinrich Rudolph Hertz, German physicist (1967)
Miguel Hidalgo y Costilla, hero of Independence (1856, 1861, 1864, 1868, 1872, 1874, 1910, 1940, 1947, 1952, 1953, 1956, 1960, 1963, 1976, 1985, 1986, 2003, 2006, 2008, 2010, 2016)
El Hijo del Santo, wrestler (2008)
Fernando Hiriart Balderrama, engineer (2014)
Rowland Hill, British inventor (1979)
Victor Hugo, French novelist (1985)
Alexander von Humboldt, German explorer and naturalist (1960, 1999)

I
José María Iglesias, president (1987)
Pedro Infante, movie star (1996)
Agustín de Iturbide, general, emperor (1921)

J
José Alfredo Jiménez, singer-songwriter(1998)
Mariano Jiménez, hero of Independence (1986)
Miguel Jiménez (19th century), gastroenterologist (1975)
Juana Inés de la Cruz, poet (1971, 1995, 2015)
Juan Carlos I, Spanish king (1977)
John Paul II, pope, (1990, 1999, 2004)
Benito Juárez, president (1879, 1882, 1915, 1926, 1950, 1972, 1998, 1999, 2006)
Margarita Maza de Juárez, first lady (1972)
Juliana, Dutch queen (1964)
Justinian I, Byzantine emperor (1972)

K
Frida Kahlo, painter (2001, 2006)
John F. Kennedy, US president (1962, 1964)
Johannes Kepler, German astronomer (1971)
Martin Luther King, US civil rights leader (1968)
Eusebio Francisco Kino, explorer (1987)
Roberto Kobeh González, leader in civil aviation (2016)
Robert Koch, German doctor (1982)

L
Francisco Lagos Cházaro, provisional president (2010)
Bartolomé de las Casas, cleric (1933, 1966)
Agustín Lara, composer (1995) (keyboard and signature pictured 1970)
Jean-Baptiste de La Salle, French saint and educator (2005)
Miguel Layún, football player (2014)
Antonio de León, general  (1947)
Miguel Lerdo de Tejada, composer (1974)
Sebastián Lerdo de Tejada, president (1974)
Franz Liszt, Hungarian composer (1986)
Xavier López, television actor and host (2006)
Miguel López de Legazpi, conquistador (1964)
Adolfo López Mateos. president (1964, 1994, 2010)
José López Portillo, president (1977)
Ignacio López Rayón, hero of Independence (1910, 1982, 2010)
Ramón López Rayón, general (2010)
Ramón López Velarde, poet (1946, 1972, 1988)
Federico García Lorca, Spanish poet (1998)
Rafael Lucio Nájera, doctor (1978)

M
Francisco I. Madero, president (1915, 1917, 1935, 1939, 1950, 1973 1985, 2008, 2009)
Nelson Mandela, South African revolutionary and president (2013)
Antonio Margil de Jesús, missionary (1946)
Sor María Engracia Josefa del Santísimo Rosario (19th century), nun (2012)
Francisco Márquez, cadet (1947)
Rafael Márquez, football player (2014)
José Martí, Cuban writer and national hero (1995)
Manolo Martínez, bullfighter (1996)
Mariano Matamoros, hero of Independence (1971)
Maximilian I of Mexico, emperor (1866)
James Clerk Maxwell, British physicist (1967)
Margarita Maza de Juárez, first lady (1972)
Agustín Melgar, cadet (1947)
Laura Méndez de Cuenca, poet, educator and feminist (2014)
Gregorio Méndez, soldier and politician (1964)
Antonio de Mendoza, viceroy (1939)
Carlos Mérida, Guatemalan painter (1991)
Manuel de Mier y Terán, general (2010)
Mil Máscaras, wrestler (2011)
Francisco Javier Mina, hero of Independence (1989, 2010)
Moctezuma I, Aztec ruler (1987)
Mario José Molina Henríquez, chemist (1997)
Fernando Montes de Oca, cadet (1947)
José María Luis Mora, political thinker (1975, 1994)
Rodolfo Morales, painter (painting shown 2001)
José María Morelos, priest and hero of Independence (1915, 1934, 1956, 1963, 1965, 1985, 2005, 2008, 2015)
Mario Moreno "Cantinflas", film star (1993, 2011)
Pedro Moreno, hero of Independence (1967, 2010)
Samuel Morse, US inventor and painter (2000)
Wolfgang Amadeus Mozart, Austrian composer (1991, 2006)
Francisco J. Múgica, soldier, revolutionary and politician (1984)
Gerardo Murillo, painter (1975) (painting Paricutín pictured 1971)

N
Antonio Narro (†1912), philanthropist (1973)
Jorge Negrete, film star (1993)
Rodolfo Neri Vela, astronaut (1985, 2010)
Amado Nervo, poet (1971)
Nezahualcóyotl, ruler of Texcoco (1972, 1980, 2002)
Nezahualpilli, ruler of Texcoco (1987)
Luis Nishizawa, painter (family mon shown 1998)
Isaac Newton, British physicist (1971)
Ramón Novarro, actor (1986) (the name is misspelled Novaro on the stamp)
Salvador Novo, poet (1975, 2004)
Jaime Nunó, composer (2004)

O
Álvaro Obregón, president (1978)
Melchor Ocampo, statesman (1940, 1956, 1975)
Guillermo Ochoa, football player (2010)
Ocho Venado Garra de Tigre, Mixtec warrior (1980)
Isaac Ochoterena, biologist (1982)
Edmundo O'Gorman, historian (2006)
Juan O'Gorman, painter and architect (2005)
Miguel Ojeda, baseball player (2010)
Martín de Olivares (1574–1604), postmaster (1979)
José Clemente Orozco, painter (1983) (painting pictured 1971)
Mariano Otero, statesman (2007)
Josefa Ortiz de Domínguez, heroine of Independence (1910, 1979, 2008)
Luis Ortiz Monasterio, sculptor (his sculpture El Dios de Hoy pictured 1979)
Gilberto Owen, poet (2004)

P
Pakal, ruler of Palenque (2002)
Louis Pasteur, French scientist (1995)
Octavio Paz, poet and writer (2014)
Víctor Paz Estenssoro, Bolivian president (1963)
Carlos Pellicer, poet (1988, 1997)
José Peón y Contreras, poet (1993)
Carlos Alberto Peña, football player (2014)
Ángela Peralta, soprano (1974, 1983)
Oribe Peralta, football player (2014)
Silverio Pérez, bullfighter (1996)
Felipe Pescador, (1880-1929) railwayman (1989)
Philip II, Spanish king (1979)
Pablo Picasso, Spanish painter (1981) (painting shown 1974)
José María Pino Suárez, vice-president (1917, 1986, 2008)
Marco Polo, Italian explorer (1967)
Manuel Ponce, composer (1974)
José Guadalupe Posada, illustrator (engraving Don Quijote pictured 1963) (1988) (engraving La despedida shown 2002) (showing drawings 2013)
Guillermo Prieto, poet and statesman (1956, 1963, 1997)
Francisco Primo de Verdad y Ramos, martyr of independence (2008)

Q
Vasco de Quiroga, cleric (1940, 1971)

R
Emilio Rabasa, politician and writer (2012)
Ignacio Ramírez, writer and statesman (1956, 1975)
Rafael Ramírez Castañeda, educator (1994, 1997)
Miguel Ramos Arizpe, priest and statesman (Constitution of 1824 shown 1993)
Ramón Rayón, general (2010)
Manuel Crescencio Rejón, jurist (1988)
Silvestre Revueltas, composer (1974, 1999) (violin and bow pictured 1990)
Alfonso Reyes, essayist and philosopher (1985, 1989)
Manuel Rincón (1784–1849), commander of Mexican forces at the Battle of Churubusco. (1947)
José Rizal, Filipino national hero (1964)
Diego Rivera, painter (1986)
Rodolfo Robles, Guatemalan doctor (1974)
Sóstenes Rocha, general (1995)
Aaron Rodríguez, wrestler (2011)
Leonardo Rodríguez Alcaine, labor leader (2016)
Wilhelm Roentgen, German physicist (1995)
José Rubén Romero, novelist (1985)
Eleanor Roosevelt, US first lady (1964)
Franklin Delano Roosevelt, US president (1947)
Juventino Rosas, composer (sheet music cover pictured 1972)
Arturo Rosenblueth, physiologist (1975)
Antonio M. Ruiz, painter (1988)
Maximiliano Ruiz Castañeda, physician (1994)
Adolfo Ruiz Cortines, president (1989)
Juan Ruiz de Alarcón, playwright (1972)
Horacio Ruiz Gaviño, (1893-1957) aviator (1967)
Juan Rulfo, writer (1996, 2005)

S
Jaime Sabines, poet (2009)
Moisés Sáenz Garza, educator (1994)
Antoine de Saint-Exupéry, French author and aviator (1994)
Pedro Sainz de Baranda, naval captain (1987, 2005)
Mario Salazar Mallén, physician (1993)
José de San Martín, South American liberator (1973)
José Luis Sandoval, baseball player (2010)
Manuel Sandoval Vallarta, nuclear physicist (1982)
El Santo, wrestler (2008)
Francisco Sarabia Tinoco (1900–1939), aviator (2000)
Domingo Faustino Sarmiento, Argentine intellectual and president (1975)
Roberto Saucedo, baseball player (2010)
Franz Schubert, Austrian composer (1978)
Sebastián, sculptor (sculpture shown 1996)
Bernardo Sepúlveda Gutiérrez, physician (1993)
Aquiles Serdán, martyr (1917, 1977, 2008)
Junípero Serra, missionary (1969)
Justo Sierra, writer (1947, 1985, 1998, 1999, 2002, 2012)
Carlos de Sigüenza y Góngora, astronomer (1973)
David Alfaro Siqueiros, painter (1975, 1996)
Fernando Soler, film actor and director (1994)
Heinrich von Stephan, German postmaster general (1974, 1997)
Antonio Stradivarius, Italian violin maker (1987)
Vicente Suárez, cadet (1947)

T
Rufino Tamayo, painter (his painting Dualidad 1964 pictured 1987; his Self-portrait pictured 1999)
Tariácuri, Purépecha ruler (1982)
Constantino de Tárnava (1898-1974), radio pioneer (1996)
Servando Teresa de Mier, hero of independence (2010)
U Thant, UN secretary-general (1966)
Josip Broz Tito, Yugoslav president (1963)
Tlahuicole (also spelled Tlahuicolli), Tlaxcaltec warrior (1976)
Manuel Tolsá, sculptor (his sculpture El caballito pictured 1976)
Toña la Negra, singer (1995)
Gerardo Torrado, football player (2010)
Jaime Torres Bodet, writer and diplomat (1975, 2011, 2016)
Gregorio Torres Quintero, educator and writer (1994, 2003)
Lupita Tovar, actress (1981)
Jacinto B. Treviño González, general (1997)
Emilio Tuero, singer and film actor (1995)

U
Andrés de Urdaneta, navigator (1966)
Virgilio Uribe, naval cadet, hero  (1964, 2014)
Francisco L. Urquizo, general and writer (1997)
Rodolfo Usigli, playwright (2005)

V
Ignacio L. Vallarta Ogazón, statesman (2005)
Leandro Valle, general (1987, 1995)
Artemio del Valle Arizpe, writer and diplomat (1967, 1985)
César Vallejo Peruvian poet (1988)
Pedro Vargas, singer and film actor (1995)
Ildefonso Vázquez, revolutionary general (1917)
José Vasconcelos, statesman and philosopher (1982, 1994, 1999, 2001, 2011)
José María Velasco, painter (1971)
Joaquín Velázquez de León, jurist and mining reformer (1983)
Fidel Velázquez Sánchez, union leader (2016)
Jules Verne, French novelist (1976)
Ricardo Vértiz (1848–1898), ophthalmologist (1976)
Leona Vicario, spy and heroine of Independence (1910, 1915, 1985, 1989)
Queen Victoria, portrayed on Penny Black (1940, 1990)
Guadalupe Victoria, president (1986, 1993, 2010)
Manuel Vilar, sculptor (sculpture of Tlahuicole pictured 1976)
Francisco "Pancho" Villa, revolutionary leader (1978, 1985, 2009, 2010, 2014)
Fernando Villalpando (1844-1902), musician (1946)
Xavier Villaurrutia, poet (2002)
Antonio Vivaldi, Italian composer (1978)

W
George Washington, US president, portrayed on first US Postage Stamp (1947)
Frank Wilson, US cardiologist (1972)

X
Xólotl, Chichimeca invader of the Valley of Mexico (1987)

Y
Agustín Yáñez, novelist (1985, 1997, 2004)

Z
Emiliano Zapata, revolutionary leader (1935, 1965, 1979, 1985, 1994, 2009, 2010)
Rosaura Zapata Cano, educator (1994)
Ignacio Zaragoza, general (1915, 1917, 1995, 2012)
Francisco Zarco, journalist and statesman (1956)
Salvador Zubirán, physician and nutricionist (1998)
Juan Zumárraga, cleric, early printer (1939)
Francisco Zúñiga, sculptor (sculpture shown'' 1994)

See also
Postage stamps and postal history of Mexico

References

Sources
 Scott catalogue

Correos de México

Mexico, List of people on stamps of
Stamps of Mexico, List of people on
Stamps
Philately of Mexico